is the largest quasi-national park in Japan. The park includes the Hidaka Mountains and Cape Erimo and is located in southeast Hokkaidō. The park was designated Erimo Prefectural Park in 1950 and Erimo Prefectural Nature Park in 1958 until it was raised to a quasi-national in 1981. It is categorized as a natural monument by World Commission on Protected Areas.

Like all quasi-national parks in Japan, the park is managed by the prefectural government.

Related cities, towns and villages
 Erimo, Hokkaidō
 Hidaka, Hokkaidō

See also
List of national parks of Japan

References

 Hidaka Sanmyaku Erimo World Database on Protected Areas, United Nations Environment Programme, World Conservation Monitoring Centre, last access 12 March 2008

External links 
J-IBIS 

National parks of Japan
Parks and gardens in Hokkaido
Protected areas established in 1950
1950 establishments in Japan